Velké Petrovice is a municipality in Náchod District in the Hradec Králové Region of the Czech Republic. It has about 400 inhabitants.

Administrative parts
The municipality is made up of villages of Maršov nad Metují, Petrovice and Petrovičky.

References

Villages in Náchod District